Spur 503, also known locally as Eisenhower Parkway is state highway spur route in southern Denison, Texas. The highway is a limited access freeway from US 75 to SH 91. The rest of the route is a surface street to its terminus at US 69. The entire route contains frontage roads.

History
The highway was originally part of US 75 until the "Katy Memorial Freeway" was built to bypass Denison. US 75 was transferred on to its present route and the old route was re-designated as Spur 503 on March 1, 1972. On December 21, 1994, Spur 503 was extended from SH 91 to US 69, replacing part of Business U.S. 75.

Junction list

References

503
Transportation in Grayson County, Texas
Freeways in Texas
U.S. Route 75